The Benn family is a British family that has been prominent in UK politics, government, public service, and business since the late nineteenth century.

 John Williams Benn (1850–1922), Liberal MP 1892–1895, 1904–1910.
 Ernest Benn (1875-1954), civil servant and later a political writer and publisher, son of John Benn.
 William Wedgwood Benn (1877–1960), Liberal and Labour MP,  1906–1918,1918–1927,1928–1931,1937–1942. Secretary of State for India 1929–1931 Secretary of State for Air 1945–1946 son of John Benn
 Tony Benn (1925–2014), Labour MP  1950–1960, 1963–1983,1984–2001. Postmaster General 1964–1966 Minister of Technology 1966–1970 Secretary of State for Industry 1974–1975 Secretary of State for Energy 1975–1979 son of William Benn
 Stephen Benn (born 1951),  director of parliamentary affairs for the Society of Biology and before that the Royal Society of Chemistry, son of Tony Benn
 Emily Benn, (born 1989), Labour Parliamentary Candidate, granddaughter of Tony Benn, daughter of Stephen Benn
 Hilary Benn (born 1953), Labour MP, 1999-since Secretary of State for International Development 2003–2007 Secretary of State for Environment, Food and Rural Affairs 2007–2010 son of Tony Benn

 
Political families of the United Kingdom
British families
English families